Mets de Guaynabo is the professional female volleyball team of Guaynabo, Puerto Rico.

Squads

Previous

Current
As of April 2011
 Head coach:  Javier Gaspar
 Assistant coach:  Renato González

Release or Transfer

References
 League Official website
 Team website

Puerto Rican volleyball clubs